Benoit is a crater on Mercury. Its floor is quite unusual, with two mounds that have been suggested to be evidence of intrusive volcanic activity on Mercury.

Its name was adopted by the International Astronomical Union (IAU) in 2009.  It is named for the Haitian painter Rigaud Benoit.

References

Impact craters on Mercury